Shuyukh al-Arrub is a Palestinian village located eleven kilometers north-east of Hebron. The village is in the Hebron Governorate Southern West Bank. According to the Palestinian Central Bureau of Statistics, the village had a population of 1,550 inhabitants in 2007.  The primary health care facilities for the village are designated by the Ministry of Health as level 2.

Location
Shuyukh al-Arrub is located 11 km north of Hebron City. It is bordered by Kuziba and Irqan Turad to the east, Beit Fajjar  to the north, Halhul and Sa'ir to the south and Al 'Arrub Camp to the west.

History

Roman period

Mamluk period
In AH 892 (1487 CE), Qansuh Al Yahyawi, the Mamluk viceroy of Damascus, renewed the water supply from Ain al-Arrub (Arrub Spring).

Late Ottoman period
In the 1850s, people from Ash Shuyukh settled the area.

In 1883, the PEF's Survey of Western Palestine (SWP) described Birket el 'Arrub as: "one of the main reservoirs supplying the aqueduct to Jerusalem. There are two channels, one from Birket Kufin, one from 'Ain Kueiziba, which join [here]."

Jordanian period
In the wake of the 1948 Arab–Israeli War, and after the 1949 Armistice Agreements, Shuyukh al-Arrub came under Jordanian rule.

The Jordanian census of 1961 found 242 inhabitants in Shuyukh Arrub.

1967 and aftermath
Since the 1967 Six Day War, Shuyukh al-Arrub has been under Israeli occupation.

References

Bibliography

External links
Survey of Western Palestine, Map 21:    IAA, Wikimedia commons
Shuyukh Al 'Arrub village (fact sheet),  Applied Research Institute–Jerusalem (ARIJ)
Shuyukh Al 'Arrub village profile, ARIJ
Shuyukh Al 'Arrub village aerial photo, ARIJ
 The priorities and needs for development in Shuyukh al 'Arrub based on the community and local authorities' assessment, ARIJ

Villages in the West Bank
Hebron Governorate
Municipalities of the State of Palestine